This is a list of 157 genera in the family Aphrophoridae, spittlebugs.

Aphrophoridae genera

 Abbalomba  c g
 Abdas  c g
 Ainoptyelus  c g
 Amarusa  c g
 Aphrophora Germar, 1821 i c g b
 Aphrophorias  c g
 Aphropsis  c g
 Ariptyelus  c g
 Atuphora  c g
 Avernus  c g
 Awafukia  c g
 Awaphora  c g
 Balsana  c g
 Basilioterpa  c g
 Bathyllus  c g
 Beesoniella  c g
 Betaclovia  c g
 Boniphora  c g
 Byrebistus  c g
 Capnodistes  c g
 Carystoterpa  c g
 Cephisus Stål, 1866 i c g
 Choua  c g
 Clovia  c g
 Cloviana  c g
 Cnemidanomia  c g
 Cordia  c g
 Costaclovia Hamilton, 1981 g
 Daha  c g
 Dasyoptera  c g
 Dinda  c g
 Dophora  c g
 Ecothera  c g
 Egretius  c g
 Eguptyelus  c g
 Enocomia  c g
 Eoptyelus  c g
 Epicranion  c g
 Escragnollia  c g
 Euclovia  c g
 Eulepyronia  c g
 Eulepyroniella  c g
 Eurycercopis  c g
 Eusounama  c g
 Flosshilda  c g
 Formophora  c g
 Fusiptyelus Hamilton, 1981 g
 Futaptyelus  c g
 Gaeta  c g
 Gallicana  c g
 Grellaphia  c g
 Handschinia  c g
 Hemiapterus  c g
 Hemipoophilus  c g
 Hiraphora  c g
 Hosophora  c g
 Hymettus  c g
 Interocrea  c g
 Iophosa  c g
 Irlandiana  c g
 Iwaptyelus  c g
 Izzardana  c g
 Jembra  c g
 Jembrana  c g
 Jembroides  c g
 Jembrophora  c g
 Jembropsis  c g
 Jophora  c g
 Kageptyelus  c g
 Kitaptyelus  c g
 Koreptyelus  c g
 Kotophora  c g
 Lallemandana  c g
 Lemoultana  c g
 Leocomia  c g
 Leocomiopsis  c g
 Lepyronia Amyot & Serville, 1843 i c g b
 Lepyroniella  c g
 Lepyronoxia  c g
 Lepyropsis  c g
 Liorhina  c g
 Macrofukia  c g
 Mandesa  c g
 Maptyelus  c g
 Megafukia  c g
 Mesoptyelus  c g
 Mimoptyelus  c g
 Miphora  c g
 Nagaclovia  c g
 Nagafukia  c g
 Nagophora  c g
 Napotrephes  c g
 Neoavernus  c g
 Neophilaenus Haupt, 1935 i c g b
 Nesaphrestes  c g
 Nikkofukia  c g
 Nikkoptyelus  c g
 Nokophora  c g
 Novaphrophara  c g
 Novophilaenus  c g
 Nyanja  c g
 Obiphora  c g
 Ogaphora  c g
 Oiptyelus  c g
 Okiptyelus  c g
 Omalophora  c g
 Orthorapha  c g
 Paralepyroniella  c g
 Paraphilaenus Vilbaste, 1962 i c g
 Paraphrophora  c g
 Pareurycercopis  c g
 Patriziana  c g
 Pentacanthoides  c g
 Perinoia  c g
 Petaphora  c g
 Peuceptyelus  c g
 Philaenarcys Hamilton, 1979 i c g b
 Philaenus Stål, 1864 i c g b
 Philagra  c g
 Philagrina  c g
 Philaronia Ball, 1898 i c g b
 Plinia  c g
 Poophilus  c g
 Pseudaphronella  c g
 Pseudaphrophora  c g
 Pseudocraniolum  c g
 Ptyelinellus  c g
 Ptyelus  c g
 Qinophora  c g
 Sabphora  c g
 Sagophora  c g
 Salomonia  c g
 Sappoptyelus  c g
 Seiphora  c g
 Sepullia  c g
 Sinophora  c g
 Sounama  c g
 Sphodroscarta  c g
 Strandiana  c g
 Takagia  c g
 Takaphora  c g
 Tamaphora  c g
 Tilophora  c g
 Tobiphora  c g
 Todophora  c g
 Tonkaephora  c g
 Toroptyelus  c g
 Tremapterus  c g
 Trigophora  c g
 Tukaphora  c g
 Vervactor  c g
 Witteella  c g
 Xenaphrophora  c g
 Yamaphora  c g
 Yaphora  c g
 Yezophora  c g
 Yunnana  c g

Data sources: i = ITIS, c = Catalogue of Life, g = GBIF, b = Bugguide.net

References

Aprophoridae